Firearm propellants are the chemical substances used to rapidly generate gas causing a pressure difference accelerating a bullet through the barrel of a firearm.  Mixtures of different chemical substances are often used to control the rate of gas release, or prevent decomposition of the propellant prior to use.  Many propellants use exothermic reactions to generate gaseous carbon monoxide, nitrogen and steam while raising temperatures to increase pressure.  The pressure relationships between propellant chemical reactions and bullet response are described as internal ballistics.

Gunpowder 
Although commonly used to describe any firearm propellant, the term gunpowder originally described mixtures of charcoal and sulfur with potassium nitrate as an oxidizing agent.  By the 20th century these early propellants were largely replaced by smokeless powder of nitrocellulose or similarly nitrated organic compounds.  The term powder may be misleading, because propellants are typically manufactured in grains of geometric shapes to physically control rate of gas production in accordance with Piobert's law.  Shotgun and handgun propellants may be flakes, while Improved Military Rifle propellants were extruded as short cylindrical tubes,  and ball propellants are small spheres.

References 

Firearm propellants